The Sea and the Bells is the third studio album by American post-rock band Rachel's. It was released on October 22, 1996 by Quarterstick Records.

The album was named after and inspired by Pablo Neruda's poetry collection of the same name.

In 2016, The Sea and the Bells was ranked at number 14 on Pastes list of the best post-rock albums, while also placing at number 16 on a similar list by Fact.

Track listing

References

Rachel's albums
1996 albums
Quarterstick Records albums